Roman Apollonovich Simovych (February 28, 1901 – 1984) was a Ukrainian composer, educator and theoretician.

Born in Sniatyn, now in Ukraine, Simovych graduated from the Prague Conservatory in 1934 - on piano (Vilém Kurz), and again in 1936 undergoing post graduate studies in composition (Vítězslav Novák). From 1936 to 1939 he was a teacher of piano and theoretical subjects at the M. Lysenko Music Institute in Drohobych and Stanislav, and from 1939 to 1942 at the music school in Stanislav (now Ivano-Frankivsk). From 1951, he was a lecturer and from 1963, a full professor at the Lviv Conservatory. He received the title Honoured Artist of the USSR (1954).

He died in 1984 and was buried in the Lviv, Ukrainian SSR, Soviet Union.

Works
 Ballet "Sopilka Dovbush" (1948, libretto by A. Herynovycha)
 7 symphonies:
 "Hutsul" (1945),
 "Lemko" (1947),
 "Spring" (1951),
 "Heroic" (1954),
 "Mountain" (1955), 
 Sixth (1965),
 Seventh (1972);
 Symphonic poems "Sergeant Maxim", "Dovbush", "In memory of Ivan Franko"
 Symphonic overtures, suites;
 Concerto for flute and symphony orchestra (1953);
 String quartet, two trios;
 Works for piano:
 2 Sonatas, Sonatina In suite,
 Variation,
 Ronda,
 Fantasy;
 Works for violin and cello and piano, Variations for harp, works for mixed choir and orchestra and unaccompanied.
 Piano concerto (19??)

References
 Encyclopedia of Ukraine
 Lupiy Gregory Lviv historical and cultural museum reserve "Cemeteries" / Guide / - Lions, "mason" - 1996, Art. 247

Ukrainian classical composers
1901 births
1984 deaths
People from Sniatyn
Ukrainian Austro-Hungarians
People from the Kingdom of Galicia and Lodomeria
Burials at Lychakiv Cemetery
20th-century composers